Mob Psycho 100 is a Japanese anime series based on the manga series created by One. The anime adaptation was produced by Bones and directed by Yuzuru Tachikawa. Hiroshi Seko wrote the scripts, Yoshimichi Kameda designed the characters, and Kenji Kawai composed the music. The series aired between July 12, 2016, and September 27, 2016, on Tokyo MX. For season 1, the opening theme song, titled "99", was performed by Mob Choir, while the ending theme song, titled , was performed by All Off. The series was simulcast on Crunchyroll, while Funimation broadcast the show's simuldub. The English dub was produced by Bang Zoom! Entertainment. On April 18, 2019, Funimation and Crunchyroll confirmed that season 2 would simuldub on April 25.

A second season of the anime series was announced, with the staff and cast returning to reprise their roles. Mob Psycho 100 II aired from January 7 to April 1, 2019, with the series being simulcast on Crunchyroll.

A third season, titled Mob Psycho 100 III, was confirmed to be in production in October 2021. It aired from October 6 to December 22, 2022. The third season's simuldub was slated to be produced by Crunchyroll rather than Bang Zoom! with some roles recast, due to the choice to move dub production to in-person recording sessions at their Dallas based studio, rather than remote recordings, after largely relying on the latter at the start of the COVID-19 pandemic. Among the planned recastings was the voice of Mob, Kyle McCarley, who stated that he would likely not be reprising the role as Crunchyroll had refused to negotiate a potential union contract for future anime dubbing productions with McCarley's union SAG-AFTRA. McCarley had offered to work non-union on season 3 under the condition that Crunchyroll have a discussion with SAG-AFTRA, but since this did not proceed, McCarley did not return. This news prompted much backlash and criticism of Crunchyroll on social media.

Series overview

Episode list

Season 1 (2016)

Season 2: II (2019)

Season 3: III (2022)

OVAs

Notes

References

External links
  

Mob Psycho 100